HMCS Buckingham was a  that served with the Royal Canadian Navy during the Second World War and as a  from 1954–1965. She was named for Buckingham, Quebec. She is considered a significant part of Canadian naval history as used for some early trials of helicopter landings on smaller escort vessels. This led to the development of the future helicopter carrying destroyers.

Buckingham was ordered 1 February 1943 as part of the 1943–1944 River-class building program. She was laid down as Royal Mount on 11 November 1943 by Davie Shipbuilding & Repairing Co. Ltd. at Lauzon and launched 28 April 1944. Her name was changed to Buckingham and she was commissioned on 2 November 1944 at Quebec City.

Background

The River-class frigate was designed by William Reed of Smith's Dock Company of South Bank-on-Tees. The first orders were placed by the Royal Navy in 1940 and the vessels were named for rivers in the United Kingdom, giving name to the class. In Canada they were named for towns and cities though they kept the same designation. The name "frigate" was suggested by Vice-Admiral Percy Nelles of the Royal Canadian Navy and was adopted later that year.

Improvements over the corvette design included markedly better accommodation. For underwater targets, the River-class frigate was equipped with a Hedgehog anti-submarine mortar and depth charge rails aft and four side-mounted throwers.

River-class frigates were the first Royal Canadian Navy warships to carry the 147B Sword horizontal fan echo sonar transmitter in addition to the regular ASDIC. This allowed the ship to maintain contact with targets even while firing unless a target was struck. Improved radar and direction-finding equipment improved the RCN's ability to find and track enemy submarines over the previous classes.

Canada originally ordered the construction of 33 frigates in October 1941. The design was too big for the shipyards on the Great Lakes so all the frigates built in Canada were built in dockyards along the west coast or along the St. Lawrence River. In all Canada ordered the construction of 60 frigates including ten for the Royal Navy that in turn transferred two to the United States Navy.

Service history
Buckingham returned to Halifax after working up at Bermuda in January 1945 and was assigned to the convoy escort group EG 28. She remained with this unit until the end of hostilities in Europe performing local escort duties for coastal convoys along the eastern coast of Canada.

The RCAF plane radioed to nearby Western Escort Force W-6 who intercepted the submarine an hour later. U-889 was ordered to head to Bay Bulls, Newfoundland. 24 hours later U-889 was turned over to the frigates Buckingham and  who escorted her to Shelburne Harbour where she was boarded.

In June 1945, Buckingham began a tropicalization refit at Liverpool, Nova Scotia in preparation for service in the Pacific Ocean. She moved to Shelburne to complete it however it was suspended before the work was done due to the Surrender of Japan. She was paid off 16 November 1945 at Sydney and placed in reserve.

Postwar service
Buckingham was sold to Marine Industries Ltd. in 1946. She was reacquired by the RCN to undergo conversion to a Prestonian-class ocean escort from 1953–1954. This meant a flush-decked appearance aft, with a larger bridge and taller funnel. Her hull forward was strengthened against ice and the quarterdeck was enclosed to contain two Squid anti-submarine mortars. Buckingham recommissioned at Montreal on 25 June 1954 with the pennant number 314.

In the summer of 1956, the Royal Canadian Navy believed that flying a helicopter equipped for anti-submarine warfare could be "married" to an existing anti-submarine platform such as a destroyer or frigate. To prove this, the RCN attached a small landing pad aft to Buckingham in October–December 1956 and attempted to land a Sikorsky HO4S-3 on it. The attempts were successful and the pad was removed and tested again on the larger . These trials demonstrated that a helicopter could be landed and would lead to the development of the Beartrap, a mechanism designed by the RCN to keep the helicopter attached to the deck once it had landed. In 1961, the frigate was a member of the Ninth Canadian Escort Squadron. In June 1961, Buckingham toured the Great Lakes, making several port visits.

Buckingham served until paid off on 23 March 1965. She was sold for scrap and broken up at La Spezia, Italy in 1966.

References

Notes

References
 
 Macpherson, Ken; Burgess, John. The ships of Canada's naval forces 1910–1981 : a complete pictorial history of Canadian warships. Collins: Toronto, 1981.

External links
 "The Beatrap, a Canadian invention" readyayeready.com

River-class frigates of the Royal Canadian Navy
1944 ships